Maria Łunkiewicz-Rogoyska (5 April 1895 – 4 September 1967) was a Polish painter. Her work was part of the painting event in the art competition at the 1936 Summer Olympics.

References

1895 births
1967 deaths
20th-century Polish painters
Polish women painters
Olympic competitors in art competitions
Artists from Ternopil
20th-century Polish women artists